MADARA Cosmetics also known as MÁDARA, is a Latvian manufacturer of organic skin care, hair care and baby care products. The ingredients include biologically certified blossoms and herbal extracts from the Northern and Baltic region. The brand name MADARA is the Latvian name for a common inhabitant of Baltic meadows – Galium mollugo, commonly known as bedstraw or wild madder. Its spatial pattern or fractal is also depicted in the logo of MADARA Cosmetics, which received the EULDA/WOLDA award and the title "Best of Latvia" in 2007. 

The company was co-founded by Lotte Tisenkopfa-Iltnere. Cosmetics NORD is a subsidiary of MADARA.

Products
The company produces over 80 different cosmetic products, including face and body care products made from herbs and flowers harvested in the Baltic region according to organic farming principles. Products include cleansers, toners and moisturizers for face, tinted moisturizers, shower soaps, body cream and lotions and products for lips.

Sustainability 
MADARA products are certified by ECOCERT and packaged in FSC certified, recyclable packaging.

In October 2022, MADARA became the first SME in the Baltic states to partner with the European Bank for Reconstruction and Development (EBRD) to reduce transport CO2 emissions by shipping products directly from the manufacturer to the customer.

References

External links
Official Website

Chemical companies established in 2006
2006 establishments in Latvia
Latvian brands
Cosmetics brands
Cosmetics companies of Latvia